Scopula subcandida is a moth of the  family Geometridae. It is found in Australia.

References

Moths described in 1938
subcandida
Moths of Australia